Cécile Prince (born 15 May 1937) is a French alpine skier. She competed in the women's slalom at the 1964 Winter Olympics.

References

1937 births
Living people
French female alpine skiers
Olympic alpine skiers of France
Alpine skiers at the 1964 Winter Olympics
Sportspeople from Grenoble
Universiade bronze medalists for France
Universiade medalists in alpine skiing
Competitors at the 1960 Winter Universiade
Competitors at the 1962 Winter Universiade
Competitors at the 1964 Winter Universiade